Julie A. Cassidy is an Australian-New Zealand law academic. She is a full professor at the University of Auckland.

Academic career

After undergraduate and honours studies at the University of Adelaide, Cassidy taught law at Adelaide before being a foundation staffer at Bond University, where she got her PhD titled  'Customary international law's protection of aboriginal rights in post colonial states (as at February 1992)' . Since then she has worked at Deakin University, Auckland University of Technology and finally Auckland University. She also has an adjunct relationship with Monash University.

Cassidy's research includes 'Brightline' tax measures, GST anti-avoidance measures and post-colonial law.

Selected works 
 Bosch, Henry, and Julie Cassidy. Corporate practices and conduct. Deakin University, 1994.
 Cassidy, Julie. "Sovereignty of aboriginal peoples." Ind. Int'l & Comp. L. Rev. 9 (1998): 65.
 Cassidy, Julie. Concise corporations law. Federation Press, 2006.
 Cassidy, Julie. "Emergence of the individual as an international juristic entity: Enforcement of international human rights." (2004): 533.
 Cassidy, Julie. "The stolen generations-Canada and Australia: The legacy of assimilation." (2006): 131.

References

External links
 

Living people
New Zealand women academics
20th-century Australian lawyers
21st-century New Zealand lawyers
New Zealand women lawyers
University of Adelaide alumni
Academic staff of the University of Adelaide
Bond University alumni
Academic staff of Bond University
Academic staff of Deakin University
Academic staff of the Auckland University of Technology
Academic staff of the University of Auckland
Year of birth missing (living people)